"Protect the Coven" is the eleventh episode of the third season of the anthology television series American Horror Story, which premiered on January 15, 2014, on the cable network FX. The episode was written by Jennifer Salt and directed by Bradley Buecker.

In this episode, Fiona (Jessica Lange) and Marie Laveau (Angela Bassett) face off with The Corporation while Cordelia (Sarah Paulson) makes a desperate sacrifice to protect the coven. Angela Bassett, Gabourey Sidibe, and Danny Huston guest star as Marie Laveau, Queenie and the Axeman, respectively. This episode is rated TV-MA (LV).

Plot

A bleeding black gardener reminds Delphine about what used to feed her soul, and she tortures him while he is bound and gagged. Spalding's ghost appears to Delphine as she wraps the dead body of the gardener. He suggests that she can regain her sense of purpose by killing Marie and offers to help. He gives her a package of Benadryl, telling her to dissolve a few tablets in Marie's drink.

The Axeman plays as Fiona dresses in his apartment. He suggests they go live at his family's farm after killing the new Supreme. She agrees but asks him to do her one small favor. 

In the greenhouse, Cordelia pierces each eye with a pair of gardening shears. Myrtle tells Fiona that Cordelia sacrificed her eyes to regain the Sight and protect the Coven. She dares Fiona to have Cordelia read and expose her secrets.

The Delphi Trust men agree to make reparations to Marie and a 100-year truce in exchange for an end to the magical siege. Fiona counters with a demand for the dissolution of the witch hunters, a house, and a private jet. They refuse. The waiter reveals himself to be the Axeman and, in retaliation for their refusal, kills all the men except Harrison. Fiona hacks Harrison's throat with the Axeman's axe.

Delphine tries and fails to kill Marie with a Benadryl-laced French 75. Spalding steps out and hits Marie in the head with his doll, knocking her down the stairs. He tells Delphine she was the only one he could trick into helping him and suggests that she bury Marie in a way that she cannot ever escape, as Marie is immortal and cannot be killed. He goes back to play with Marie's stolen baby. 

Zoe and Kyle escape the coven and catch a bus to Orlando, Florida.

Reception
Rotten Tomatoes reports a 79% approval rating, based on 14 reviews. The critical consensus reads, ""Protect the Coven" satisfyingly sets the table for the season finale with a suitably gross installment whose extra plot point makes its hard-to-follow storyline even more confusing." Dennis Perkins of The A.V. Club rated the episode a B+, stating, "Broadcast television could stand to be a good measure weirder and more outrageous, especially when affording some of the country's greatest actresses (actresses 'of a certain age' no less) a chance to really go for it in prime time." Matt Fowler from IGN gave the episode a rating of 7.2/10, stating, ""Protect the Coven" already had its fair share of take-backs and fizzle-outs as it was, what with Delia re-blinding herself (which, I believe, is the first reversal of a reversal) and the disappointing end to the witch hunter story."

The episode received a 1.9 18–49 ratings share and was watched by 3.46 million viewers in its original American broadcast, a decrease from the previous episode.

References

External links

 
 "Protect the Coven" at TV Guide.com

Fiction set in 1830
2014 American television episodes
American Horror Story: Coven episodes